The Eagle Hill Historic District is a residential historic district roughly bounded by Meridian, Princeton, and White Streets meeting in Prescott Square in the East Boston neighborhood of Boston, Massachusetts.  This part of East Boston was developed roughly between 1834 and 1900, and includes a remarkable concentration of original housing stock.  The neighborhood is dense, with a mix of single-family and multiple-family (generally two- or three-unit) wood frame housing.  The preponderance of these buildings are Italianate, Second Empire or Renaissance Revival in style, with earlier Greek Revival and later Colonial Revival and Queen Anne styling present in smaller numbers.  Some of the most prominent properties in the district are: the Donald McKay House (78-80 White St), Trinity Neighborhood House (406 Meridian St.), the Paul Curtis Mansion (402 Meridian St.), and the William Waters Jr. House (57 Trenton St.).   Another noteworthy property in the district is the East Boston High School located at the top of the hill, built on a site formerly used as a reservoir.

The district was added to the National Register of Historic Places in 1998.

External links 
 http://www.historiceaglehill.org

See also
National Register of Historic Places listings in northern Boston, Massachusetts

References

Historic districts in Suffolk County, Massachusetts
History of Boston
East Boston
National Register of Historic Places in Boston
Historic districts on the National Register of Historic Places in Massachusetts